The Committee Representing Pyidaungsu Hluttaw (abbreviated CRPH) is a Burmese legislative body in exile, representing a group of National League for Democracy lawmakers and members of parliament ousted in the 2021 Myanmar coup d'état. The Committee consists of 17 members of the Pyithu Hluttaw and Amyotha Hluttaw.

The Committee claims to carry out the duties of Myanmar's dissolved legislature, the Pyidaungsu Hluttaw, and has formed a government in exile, the National Unity Government, in cooperation with several ethnic minority insurgent groups.

History
Representatives elected in the November 2020 elections have not officially recognized the legitimacy of the coup d'état. On 4 February 2021, around 70 MP-elects from the NLD took an oath of office in Naypyidaw, pledging to abide by the people's mandate, and to serve as lawmakers for a five-year term. The following day, 15 NLD politicians led by Phyu Phyu Thin, a Pyithu Hluttaw member representing Yangon's Mingala Taungnyunt Township, formed the committee to conduct parliamentary affairs. The committee held its first session on Zoom.

On 7 February, CRPH condemned the military's efforts to overthrow a civilian-elected government as a "criminal act" in violation of Chapter 6 of the Myanmar Penal Code, and dismissed the legitimacy of Myint Swe's Cabinet. CRPH has also advised UN diplomats and the international community to work directly with the committee in relation to official government business.

On 9 February, CRPH enacted the State Counsellor Law, extending the term of the State Counsellor of Myanmar for another five years, through 1 April 2026. The same day, it issued a statement condemning the military's violent crackdown of the ongoing 2021 Myanmar protests, calling for the preservation of freedom of speech and its support of the civil disobedience movement.

On 10 February, the committee announced the addition of two elected MPs from ethnic political parties, namely the Ta'ang National Party and the Kayah State Democratic Party.

On February 15, the junta charged the 17 members of the CRPH with incitement under section 505b of the Penal Code, which carries a maximum sentence of two years in prison.

On 22 February, the committee appointed Sasa as its special envoy to the United Nations and Htin Linn Aung as special representative of its international relations office which opened in Maryland, United States of America.

On 1 March, CRPH declared the State Administration Council (SAC) a terrorist group for its "atrocities and the act of terrorism" on the unarmed civilians. On the following day, the committee appointed Zin Mar Aung, Lwin Ko Latt, Tin Tun Naing and Zaw Wai Soe as acting union ministers in its cabinet.

On 9 March 2021, the Committee named Mahn Win Khaing Than Acting Vice-President of Myanmar.

The CRPH withdrew its designation of all ethnic armed organisations (EAOs) as terrorist groups. The CRPH declared the abolishment of the 2008 Constitution and published a 20-page Charter for Federal Democracy on 2 April 2021.

On 16 April 2021, the CRPH announced the formation of the National Unity Government, which includes ousted lawmakers, members of ethnic groups, and key figures in the anti-coup protest.

Members

Acting cabinet of Committee Representing Pyidaungsu Hluttaw

On 2 March 2021, the committee installed four government ministers, who would be responsible for nine ministries. Three of them are elected members from the NLD and one is the rector of the University of Medicine 1. According to the statement of the CRPH, its prime purpose is to fulfill the duties of the civilian government. The committee officially stated it would assign other suitable persons to assume the duties on behalf of cabinet members On 9 March, it named Mahn Win Khaing Than, the third Speaker of the Assembly of the Union of Myanmar between 2016 and 2018, as the acting Vice-President of Myanmar and declared that he would perform the duties of the President in his absence. The acting cabinet was abolished and formed the National Unity Government on 16  April 2021.

Heads of The Cabinet

Cabinet members

References

External links

2021 establishments in Myanmar
Democratization
Governments in exile
Internal conflict in Myanmar
Legislatures of Myanmar